Charles-François-César Le Tellier, marquis de Montmirail (Paris, 11 or 12 September 1734 – Paris, 13 December 1764) was a French military officer, member of the French Royal Academy of Sciences.

Biography 
Charles-François-César Le Tellier was born to François-César Le Tellier de Courtanvaux. First bearing the title of Marquis de Crusy, he took the title of Marquis de Montmirail from his father when he himself took the title of Marquis de Courtanvaux when Charles-François-César's grandfather died.

He studied at the Jesuit college Louis-le-Grand in Paris, showing interest in physics and natural sciences. He also studied humanities and philosophy under Père de Merville, professor of Mathematics at the Collège des Jésuites.

At 17, he joined the First Musketeer Company.

After three years of service in the Musketeers of the Guard, the King granted him the position of Captain-Colonel of the Hundred Swiss, his father resigning in his favour. He was commissioned on 28 November 1754 and, the next day, promoted to Colonel, so as to be able to serve in the Army when the Swiss could not, as they were obliged to always stay with the King himself.

In 1757, Montmirail's uncle Marshal d'Estrées joined the Army and Montmirail was appointed his aide-de-camp. He took part in the Battle of Hastenbeck in July 1757.

References

18th-century French people
Members of the French Academy of Sciences
Knights of the Order of Saint Louis
French military personnel
1734 births
1764 deaths